The third season of the television series Xena: Warrior Princess commenced airing in the United States and Canada on September 29, 1997, concluded on May 11, 1998, and contained 22 episodes.

The Third season aired in the United States on the USA Network. The season was released on DVD as a five disc boxed set under the title of Xena: Warrior Princess: Season 3 in February 2004 by Anchor Bay Entertainment.

Production

Cast
 Lucy Lawless as Xena
 Renee O'Connor as Gabrielle
 Ted Raimi as Joxer
 Kevin Smith as Ares, God of War
 Hudson Leick as Callisto
 Karl Urban as Caesar
 Alexandra Tydings as Aphrodite
 Marton Csokas as Borias
 Danielle Cormack as Ephiny
 Bruce Campbell as Autolycus

Reception

Episodes

References

External links
 https://www.imdb.com/title/tt0112230/

1997 American television seasons
1998 American television seasons
Xena: Warrior Princess seasons